Ciliata is a genus of fishes in the family Lotidae, with these currently recognized species:
 Ciliata mustela (Linnaeus, 1758) (fivebeard rockling)
 Ciliata septentrionalis (Collett, 1875) (northern rockling)
 Ciliata tchangi S. Z. Li, 1994

References

Lotidae
Ray-finned fish genera